Sport Press was a daily sports newspaper in Macedonia, now known as North Macedonia. The first issue of Sport Press was published on November 18, 2009. The main editor was Robert Aleksoski. It was published every day except Sunday. Its price was 15 denari.

The newspaper ceased publication with its last issue on April 20, 2010 due to financial problems. A total of 125 issues were published.

Editorial staff
Editor in chief

 Robert Aleksoski - main editor
 Emil Kitanoski - editor
 Laste Dimitrievski - assistant editor

Journalists
 Vojislav Mojsovski  - domestic football
 Samoil Petreski  - domestic and foreign basketball
 Dragan Jovanov - domestic and foreign basketball
 Dragan Vidinikj - other domestic sports
 Ljubisha Vladimirov - international football (La Liga), F1, other international sports
 Filip Zdraveski - international football (Serie A, Bundesliga), ice hockey (NHL), other international sports
 Milosh Denkovski - international football (Premier League, Ligue 1), other international sports
 Fidan Kominovski - handball

Proofreading
 Svetlana Arsovska

References

2009 establishments in the Republic of Macedonia
2010 disestablishments in the Republic of Macedonia
Defunct newspapers
Macedonian-language newspapers
Newspapers established in 2009
Publications disestablished in 2010
Newspapers published in North Macedonia